Bullets Over Broadway is a 1994 American black comedy crime film directed by Woody Allen, written by Allen and Douglas McGrath and starring an ensemble cast including John Cusack, Dianne Wiest, Chazz Palminteri and Jennifer Tilly.

The film was nominated for seven Academy Awards, including Allen and co-writer Douglas McGrath for Original Screenplay, Allen for Director, Wiest & Tilly for Supporting Actress and Palminteri for Supporting Actor. Wiest won Best Supporting Actress for her performance, the second time Allen directed her to an Academy Award. It is considered one of Allen's best works. This is the most recent Allen-directed film with a shared writing credit.

Summary
In 1928, David Shayne is an idealistic young playwright newly arrived on Broadway. Desperate to gain financing for his play, God of Our Fathers, he is convinced by producer Julian Marx to cast actress Olive Neal, the girlfriend of gangster Nick Valenti, in a minor role.

Compensating for his frustration with the demanding and talentless Olive, Shayne is thrilled to cast alcoholic faded star Helen Sinclair in the lead role, along with the dieting British thespian Warner Purcell. Rehearsals are soon thrown into chaos when Olive shows up escorted by Cheech, a mob henchman, who insists on watching rehearsals.

Eventually Cheech starts giving notes on the script to Shayne, who is initially angered by the intrusion but quickly realises the ideas are excellent. Cheech, who barely learned to read before burning down his school, has a natural talent for playwriting, but is not interested in taking any credit. The cast members herald the revised script as genius, disparaging his initial draft as dull and pompous.

Buoyed by their imminent success, Shayne and the actors succumb to their vices. His partner, Ellen, catches him cheating on her with Helen. Warner indulges in overeating and begins an affair with Olive, which he attempts to break off when Cheech threatens his life. Growing increasingly frustrated with Olive's poor acting, Cheech tries to have her fired from the production. After Shayne reminds him he can't get rid of Olive, Cheech murders her and dumps her body in a river.

Olive's murder is widely assumed to be part of an inter-gang conflict, but Shayne immediately senses the truth and argues with Cheech. Regretting his mistakes, Shayne is dismayed to learn that Ellen is leaving him for his hedonistic Marxist friend Sheldon Flender.

On opening night, Valenti accuses Cheech of the murder, which he denies. Henchmen Rocco and Aldo chase Cheech backstage while the play is being performed, shooting him. With his dying words, Cheech gives Shayne a new final line for the play. The play is a critical and commercial hit, but Shayne skips the after party to confront Flender. He confesses his lack of talent and proposes marriage to Ellen, who accepts his newfound desire to leave high society.

Cast

 John Cusack as David Shayne
 Dianne Wiest as Helen Sinclair
 Jennifer Tilly as Olive Neal
 Chazz Palminteri as Cheech
 Mary-Louise Parker as Ellen
 Jack Warden as Julian Marx
 Joe Viterelli as Nick Valenti
 Rob Reiner as Sheldon Flender
 Tracey Ullman as Eden Brent
 Jim Broadbent as Warner Purcell
 Harvey Fierstein as Sid Loomis
 Brian McConnachie as Mitch Sabine
 Stacey Nelkin as Rita
 Edie Falco as Lorna
 Benay Venuta as Adoring Theatre Patron
 Debi Mazar as Violet
 Małgorzata Zajączkowska as Lili
 Tony Sirico as Rocco
 Tony Darrow as Aldo
 Shannah Laumeister Stern as Movie Theatre Victim

Production
The film's locales include the duplex co-op on the 22nd floor of 5 Tudor City Place in Manhattan.

The film's title may have been an homage to a lengthy sketch of the same title from the 1950s television show Caesar's Hour; one of Allen's first jobs in television was writing for Sid Caesar specials after the initial run of the show.
The film featured the last screen appearance of Benay Venuta. Allen cast her in a cameo role as a well-wishing wealthy theatre patron. She died of lung cancer months after the film opened.

Soundtrack

Toot, Toot, Tootsie (Goo' Bye!) - Written by Dan Russo, Ernie Erdman and Gus Kahn - Performed by Al Jolson with the Vitaphone Orchestra
Crazy Rhythm - Lyrics by Irving Caesar - Music by Joseph Meyer (songwriter) & Roger Wolfe Kahn
You've Got To See Mamma Every Night Or You Can't See Mamma At All - Lyrics by Billy Rose - Music by Con Conrad
Make Believe - Music by Jerome Kern - Lyrics by Oscar Hammerstein II - Performed by The Three Deuces Musicians
That Jungle Jamboree - Written by Andy Razaf, Harry Brooks & Fats Waller - Performed by Duke Ellington
Lazy River - Written by Hoagy Carmichael & Sidney Arodin - Performed by New Leviathan Oriental Fox Trot Orchestra
Nagasaki - Music by Harry Warren - Lyrics by Mort Dixon
Let's Misbehave - By Cole Porter - Performed by Irving Aaronson and his Commanders
You Took Advantage Of Me - Music by Richard Rodgers - Lyrics by Lorenz Hart
When the Red, Red Robin Comes Bob, Bob Bobbin' Along - Written by Harry M. Woods
Ma (He's Making Eyes At Me) - Lyrics by Sidney Clare - Music by Con Conrad - Performed by Eddie Cantor with Henri Rene and His Orchestra
Thou Swell - Music by Richard Rodgers - Lyrics by Lorenz Hart
At The Jazz Band Ball - Written by Nick LaRocca & Larry Shields - Performed by Bix Beiderbecke
Poor Butterfly - Music by Raymond Hubbell - Lyrics by John Golden - Performed by Red Nichols and His Five Pennies
That Certain Feeling - Music by George Gershwin - Lyrics by Ira Gershwin
Who - Music by Jerome Kern - Lyrics by Otto A. Harbach & Oscar Hammerstein II - Performed by George Olsen

Reception
Bullets Over Broadway received a positive response from critics.  The review-aggregate website Rotten Tomatoes reports 95% positive reviews from 60 critics, with an average rating of 7.90/10. The consensus reads, "A gleefully entertaining backstage comedy, Bullets Over Broadway features some of Woody Allen's sharpest, most inspired late-period writing and direction."

Janet Maslin of The New York Times described the film as "a bright, energetic, sometimes side-splitting comedy with vital matters on its mind, precisely the kind of sharp-edged farce [Allen] has always done best."  Todd McCarthy of Variety similarly called it "a backstage comedy bolstered by healthy shots of prohibition gangster melodrama and romantic entanglements" and wrote, "In its mixing of showbiz and gangsters, this is a nice companion piece to Allen's Broadway Danny Rose, and about as amusing."  Roger Ebert of the Chicago Sun-Times praised, "Bullets Over Broadway shares a kinship with a more serious film by Allen, Crimes and Misdemeanors, in which a man committed murder and was able, somehow, to almost justify it. Now here is the comic side of the same coin. The movie is very funny and, in the way it follows its logic wherever it leads, surprisingly tough."

The film grossed $13.4 million in the United States and Canada and $24.1 million internationally for a worldwide total of $37.5 million.

Awards and nominations

Year-end lists
 4th – National Board of Review
 4th –  Glenn Lovell, San Jose Mercury News
 4th – Sean P. Means, The Salt Lake Tribune
 5th – Robert Denerstein, Rocky Mountain News
 8th – Peter Travers, Rolling Stone
 8th – Kevin Thomas, Los Angeles Times
 8th – John Hurley, Staten Island Advance
 10th – Yardena Arar, Los Angeles Daily News
 11th – Janet Maslin, The New York Times
 Top 9 (not ranked) – Dan Webster, The Spokesman-Review
 Top 10 (listed alphabetically, not ranked) – Bob Ross, The Tampa Tribune
 Top 10 (not ranked) – Dennis King, Tulsa World
 Top 10 (not ranked) – Howie Movshovitz, The Denver Post
 Top 5 runners-up (not ranked) – Scott Schuldt, The Oklahoman
 Honorable mentions – Mike Clark, USA Today
 Honorable mention – Duane Dudek, Milwaukee Sentinel
 Honorable mention – Michael MacCambridge, Austin American-Statesman
 Guilty pleasure – Douglas Armstrong, The Milwaukee Journal

Stage musical
Allen adapted the film as a stage Jukebox musical, titled Bullets Over Broadway the Musical. The musical is directed and choreographed by Susan Stroman, produced by Julian Schlossberg and Allen's younger sister Letty Aronson, with a score from the American songbook using songs from the 1920s and 1930s. The new musical premiered on Broadway at the St. James Theatre on April 10, 2014. A staged reading was held in June 2013. The cast features Zach Braff as David Shayne, Brooks Ashmanskas, Betsy Wolfe, Lenny Wolpe, and Vincent Pastore. Marin Mazzie stars as Helen Sinclair, and Karen Ziemba appears as "Eden Brent." Musical supervisor Glen Kelly has adapted and written additional lyrics for songs including "Tain't Nobody's Bus'ness," "Running Wild," "Let's Misbehave" and "I Found A New Baby". The musical closed on August 24, 2014, after 156 performances and 33 previews.

References

External links

Where's Woody? in Boston Review: article discussing the Nietzschean influences in Bullets Over Broadway

1994 films
1990s crime comedy films
American crime comedy films
American satirical films
1990s English-language films
Films directed by Woody Allen
Films adapted into plays
Films about actors
Films about writers
Films featuring a Best Supporting Actress Academy Award-winning performance
Films featuring a Best Supporting Actress Golden Globe-winning performance
Films set in New York City
Films set in the Roaring Twenties
Films set in 1928
Films shot in New York City
Mafia comedy films
Films produced by Robert Greenhut
Films produced by Letty Aronson
Films produced by Jean Doumanian
Miramax films
Films set in a theatre
Films with screenplays by Woody Allen
Films with screenplays by Douglas McGrath
1994 comedy films
1990s American films